Marthine Lund ( 1817 – after 1870) was an early Norwegian photographer from Drammen who headed the photographic studio Marthine Lund & Co., on Grændsegaden. 

She shared the apartment and studio with the German photographer Anna Kreetz and her niece Octavia Sperati, an actress. The business ran from 1865 to around 1870.

References

1817 births
People from Drammen
Norwegian women photographers
19th-century Norwegian photographers
Year of death missing
19th-century women photographers